Hit Man is a 1972 American crime film directed by George Armitage and starring Bernie Casey, Pam Grier and Lisa Moore. It is a blaxploitation-themed adaptation of Ted Lewis' 1970 novel Jack's Return Home, more famously adapted as Get Carter (1971), with the action relocated from England to the United States.

Plot
Oakland hitman Tyrone Tackett (Bernie Casey) comes home to southern California for the funeral of his brother Cornell. Cornell left behind his wild daughter Rochelle (Candy All), who rejects Tyrone's offer to live with him. Tyrone befriends his late brother's business partner, Sherwood Epps (Sam Laws), and stays in town to investigate his brother's death. He is threatened by gangsters who tell him to leave town, but they've threatened the wrong man.

Cast

 Bernie Casey as Tyrone Tackett
 Pam Grier as Gozelda
 Lisa Moore as Laural Garfoot
 Bhetty Waldron as Irvelle Way
 Sam Laws as Sherwood Epps
 Candy All as Rochelle Tackett
 Don Diamond as Nano Zito
 Edmund Cambridge as Theotis Oliver
 Bob Harris as Shag Merriweather
 Rudy Challenger as Julius Swift
 Tracy Ann-King as Nita Biggs
 Christopher Joy as Leon
 Roger E. Mosley as Baby Huey
 John Lupton as Commercial Director
 Paul Gleason as Cop

Production
George Armitage says he never saw Get Carter before making the film, claiming that producer Gene Corman gave him a copy of the script with no title and said that MGM owned it. Armitage rewrote it to be set in the African American community, and only then did his agent tell him it was Get Carter. Armitage:

I didn't feel at the time that a white director should be directing it. So I met with Bernie Casey, the film's star, who wanted to direct it, and campaigned for him with Gene, and he said: "I don't want to take a chance on someone who hasn't directed." So he wasn't going to make the picture, and at that point there was a lot of crew and cast involved, and they were friends, so I said: "Okay, I'll do it." There was a great deal of improvisation by the actors, who were bringing me dialogue from the African-American community, and it really worked. Growing up in a racially mixed neighborhood, like I did in Baldwin Hills, I knew a little bit about the culture, but the actors brought so much in terms of dialogue and honesty ... The Colonial Motel up on Sunset worked beautifully for us, and we also shot at a funeral home in southwest L.A., we shot all over there, with a crazy police escort holding traffic on every location. And between locations I'd get in a squad car with these crazy cops and drive 150 mph to the next location, I thought: "God, Roger would be so thrilled with that, that's the way to travel." And I'm so glad we were able to shoot in the Watts Towers, right down there at 103rd.

Hit Man marked the second time Corman had produced a blaxploitation film for Metro-Goldwyn-Mayer (MGM) that was based on a novel which had previously been adapted for one of the company's films, following Cool Breeze, an adaptation of W. R. Burnett's novel The Asphalt Jungle, which had previously inspired the film of the same name. Both of Corman's productions shared several cast and crew members, including Pam Grier, Rudy Challenger and Sam Laws. The film follows details from Lewis' novel more closely than Get Carter, and does not end with the protagonist's death.

Reception
Hit Man earned an estimated $1.19 million in North American rentals in 1973. According to the January 1973 edition of Variety, the film was condemned by the National Legion of Decency, which stated that its "dizzying spectacle of raw sex and supergraphic violence would horrify the Marquis de Sade".

See also
 List of American films of 1972

References

External links
 
 
 
 
 

1970s crime action films
1970s English-language films
1972 films
Films based on British novels
Blaxploitation films
Metro-Goldwyn-Mayer films
Films produced by Gene Corman
American remakes of British films
American neo-noir films
American crime action films
Films directed by George Armitage
1970s American films